Edwin Oppler (18 June 1831, in Oels – 6 September 1880, in Hanover) was a German architect of Jewish ancestry, and a major representative of the Neo-Gothic style. He designed several synagogues, throughout Germany, all of which were destroyed by rioters on  Kristallnacht.

Biography 
He was the second son of Saloh Oppler, a wine merchant, and his wife Minna, née Seldis. Very little is known about his childhood, except that he attended primary school in Oels from 1837 to 1840, then went to school in Breslau. In 1849, he went to Hanover, where he studied with Conrad Wilhelm Hase at the Technical University until 1854. This was followed by an apprenticeship as a carpenter. 

It was in the latter capacity that he became involved in the restoration of Notre Dame, and acquired his knowledge of Gothic architecture. He returned to Hanover in 1861.

In 1866, the year he was appointed a building officer, he married Ella Cohen, daughter of the Royal Physician, Hermann Cohen.

He established himself in the Jewish community through numerous commercial and residential buildings, designed for noble and bourgeois clients, but mostly through his synagogues and designs for Jewish cemeteries.

Many of his buildings were destroyed by bombing in World War II.

He died from what was apparently a rapid onset of heart disease, aged only forty-nine.

Selected projects

References

Further reading 
 
 Saskia Rohde: "Im Zeichen der Hannoverschen Architekturschule. Der Architekt Edwin Oppler (1831–1880) und seine schlesischen Bauten", In: Hannoversche Geschichtsblätter. New edition, Vol. 54, 2000 [2002], pp.67–86.
 Peter Schulze]]: "Oppler, Edwin", In: Dirk Böttcher, Klaus Mlynek, Waldemar R. Röhrbein, Hugo Thielen (Eds.): Hannoversches Biographisches Lexikon. Von den Anfängen bis in die Gegenwart, Schlütersche, Hanover 2002, pg.276.
 Harold Hammer-Schenk: "Edwin Opplers Theorie des Synagogenbaus. Emanzipationsversuche durch Architektur". In: Hannoversche Geschichtsblätter. New edition, Vol. 33, 1979, pp.99–117.

External links 

 Data on Edwin Oppler @  Architekten und Künstler mit direktem Bezug zu Conrad Wilhelm Hase
 

1831 births
1880 deaths
19th-century German architects
Synagogue architecture
Jewish architects
University of Hanover alumni
People from Oleśnica